The 2013 IAUM World Championships were the 24th edition of the International Association for Ultra-Multievents World Championships. They were held at the Yeovil Olympiads Athletics Club track in Yeovil, Somerset, from 24-25 August 2013. It was the fourth time that Great Britain had hosted the World Championships.

Event Schedule 
The event was made up of two different combined events competitions, an icosathlon for men and a tetradecathlon for women.

References

Combined events competitions
IAUM World Championships
Sport in Yeovil
Sports competitions in Somerset
International athletics competitions hosted by England
IAUM World Championships
IAUM World Championships